Joaquim Roriz (4 August 1936 – 27 September 2018) was a Brazilian politician. He was the first elected governor of the Federal District, in 1990, and served three separate terms between 1991 and 2006. He had previously held the office as an appointee from the federal government between 1988 and 1990.

References

1936 births
2018 deaths
Governors of the Federal District (Brazil)
Members of the Federal Senate (Brazil)
Members of the Chamber of Deputies (Brazil) from the Federal District
Mayors of Goiânia
People from Goiás
Federal District (Brazil) politicians